The Milmilgee Falls, a waterfall on the Freshwater Creek, is located in the Far North region of Queensland, Australia.

Location and features

See also

 List of waterfalls of Queensland

References

  

Waterfalls of Far North Queensland